A nontraditional student is a term originating in North America, that refers to a category of students at colleges and universities.

The National Center for Education Statistics (NCES) notes that there are varying definitions of nontraditional student. Nontraditional students are contrasted with traditional students who "earn a high school diploma, enroll full time immediately after finishing high school, depend on parents for financial support, and either do not work during the school year or work part time". The NCES categorized anyone who satisfies at least one of the following as a nontraditional student:

Delays enrollment (does not enter postsecondary education in the same calendar year that high school ended)
Attends part-time for at least part of the academic year
Works full-time (35 hours or more per week) while enrolled
Is considered financially independent for purposes of determining eligibility for financial aid
Has dependents other than a spouse (usually children, but may also be caregivers of sick or elderly family members)
Does not have a high school diploma (completed high school with a GED or other high school completion certificate or did not finish high school)

By this definition, the NCES determined that 73% of all undergraduates in 1999–2000 could be considered nontraditional, representing the newly "typical" undergraduate. This remained consistent the following years: 72% in 2003–2004, 72% for 2007–2008, and 74% for 2011–2012.

History
It is uncertain exactly how or when the term “nontraditional student” was first incorporated into educational language. However, it is thought that K. Patricia Cross is responsible for the phrase becoming the accepted and appropriate term to describe adult students.

In 2018, PBS' Next Avenue wrote that nontraditional students were the new normal, stating that the majority of degree seekers were adult learners, a demographic who educational institutions are increasingly easing access to. The article reported that sixty percent of Americans aged 23 to 55 without bachelor's degrees have considered returning to school, but costs and student debts were deterrents. The author identified four reason people fifty years or older are returning to school:
 searching for a second-chapter career
 staying competitive in the workforce
 creating new challenges/learning new things
 meeting a long-held goal

Demographics
The typical college student is no longer a full-time student who enrolls immediately after high school, lives on-campus and who has limited family, employment, and financial obligations.

Regarding the 2011-2012 demographics distribution of nontraditional undergraduate students in the United States, the following were identified by the National Center for Education Statistics:
 49% dependent and 51% independent
 28% has dependent(s) and 72% has no dependent
 15% single with dependent and 85% single with no dependent
 91% high school graduate and 9% high school equivalency
 66% delayed postsecondary enrollment less than one year and 34% delayed postsecondary enrollment one year or more
 57% fulltime student and 43% part-time student
 26% worked full time, 36% worked part time, and 38% did not work.

In 1999–2000, the most common nontraditional characteristics included financial independence (51 percent),  part-time attendance (48 percent), and delayed enrollment (46 percent).

The NCES divides tertiary educational institutions into three categories: public, private-non-profit, and private-for-profit (PFP). With regard to the age demographic of students enrolled in these institutions, the NCES uses three age categories: under 25, between 25 and 34, and 35 and older. According to its most recent publication, in a section called The Condition of Education 2013,"most nontraditional students are enrolled in PFP’s. In fact, for the fall enrollment in 2011, in four-year PFP institutions 71% full-time and 78% part-time students were at least 25 years old or older. In two-year PFP institutions, 52% full-time and 61% part-time students were also included in this 'nontraditional' category."

Special characteristics
Nontraditional students frequently have different characteristics than traditional students, experience different barriers, and have different instructional and campus support needs than traditional students.

While many institutions offer programs for nontraditional students and services in response to their specific needs, it is frequently observed that traditional higher education programs and policies are geared toward, and the outcome of, the previous era when traditional students were the main market for higher education. Institutional barriers most frequently identified in research include difficulty obtaining financial support, negative attitudes toward adult learners, a general lack of resources at times and places suitable to adult learners, and recognition of prior learning and academic credentials. The nontraditional student designation has also to a lesser extent been used to refer to socially, economically or educationally disadvantaged students. 

Situational barriers most frequently experienced by adult nontraditional students typically include managing multiple conflicting responsibilities in addition to their studies (e.g., life and work responsibilities and roles), financial problems and limited financial aid options for nontraditional students, lack of adequate and affordable childcare services, and lack of support from others.

Attitudinal barriers most frequently identified in research include low self-esteem and negative attitudes about being an adult learner.

Barriers related to academic skills most frequently discussed in the literature include a lack of knowledge and experience in literacy, numeracy, and computer-related skills, accessing and understanding information, critical and reflective thinking, essay writing, and writing examinations and tests.

An Australian study conducted in 2017 sampled 442 (316 female, 126 male) first year undergraduate psychology students at a major publicly funded university. Data was drawn from an online mental health survey to measure student resilience. Resilience can be defined as the ‘personal qualities that enable one to thrive in the face of adversity’ (Connor and Davidson, 2003: 76). The Connor–Davidson Resilience Scale (CD-RISC 10; Campbell-Sills and Stein, 2007) was adopted as a measure of resilience. Out of the total 442 respondents, 25.6% identified themselves as ‘non-traditional’ students (n = 113). Those who identified themselves as ‘non-traditional’ were significantly different from those who considered themselves as ‘traditional’ on a number of demographic measures. They were more likely to be male, older, hold a previous degree, study part-time, be an international student, speak a language other than English, have longer gap year, have more children, be reliant on government financial aid, work longer hours and admit to university via methods alternative to the standard pathway (i.e. Australian Tertiary Admission Rank). The most common reason that students used to identify themselves as ‘non-traditional’ was age (58.4%, n = 66). Other reasons included cultural background (43.4%, n = 50), admission pathway (42.5%, n = 48), geographical origin (30.1%, n = 34), being employed (25.7%, n = 29), household income (20.4%, n = 23), being a parent (18.6%, n = 21) and mode of study (14.2%, n = 16). Seventeen students nominated other reasons (15.9%, n = 17), including richer life experience and reason for study (e.g. for self-improvement rather than occupational reasons). The major finding from this study is that those who perceived themselves to be ‘non-traditional’, particularly in terms of age, roles as a parent and role as an employee, have reported higher resilience.

Resources

U.S. News & World Report, known for education ranking, published a guide to help nontraditional students navigate topics such as the application process, selecting the best fit college, and financial aid.

See also
Adult education
Adult learner (known as "mature student" in the UK)
Alpha Sigma Lambda
Continuing education
First-generation college students in the United States

References

Further reading
 Chao, E. L., DeRocco, E. S., & Flynn, M. K. (2007). Adult Learners in Higher Education: Barriers to Success and Strategies to Improve Results (Employment and Training Administration Occasional Paper 2007-03). Washington, DC: U.S. Department of Labor, Employment and Training Administration. Accessed at http://files.eric.ed.gov/fulltext/ED497801.pdf 
 Donaldson, J. F., & Townsend, B. K. (2007). Higher Education Journals' Discourse about Adult Undergraduate Students. The Journal of Higher Education, 78(1), 27-50.
 Kasworm, C. E. (1990). Adult Undergraduates in Higher Education: A Review of Past Research Perspectives. Review of Educational Research, 60(3), 345-372.
 Ross-Gordon, J. M. (2011). Research on Adult Learners: Supporting the Needs of a Student Population that is No Longer Nontraditional. Peer Review, 13(1), 26. Accessed at https://www.aacu.org/publications-research/periodicals/research-adult-learners-supporting-needs-student-population-no

External links
Yesterday's Nontraditional Student is Today's Traditional Student. Center for Law and Social Policy, June 29, 2011.

Academia
Types of students